Marys Peak (formerly Mary's Peak and sometimes still spelled this way) is a mountain in Benton County, Oregon, United States, just southwest of Philomath. According to the Benton County Historical Society, the native Kalapuya called the peak tcha Timanwi, or 'place of spiritual power. It is the highest peak in the Oregon Coast Range. It is also the highest point in Benton County,
and ranks eleventh in the state for prominence. The current name, given by settlers of European ancestry, may have been inspired by Mary Lloyd, who came to Oregon in 1845, and was known as the first white woman to cross the Marys River, which has its origin on the mountain, though there are alternate theories about the name.

On a clear day at the top of the peak, facing east, northeast, and southeast, one can see the cities and suburbs of the Willamette Valley, as well as the Cascade Range. To the west, the Pacific Ocean is visible on clear days.

The road to the peak now remains open in the winter.  During the 2010–2011 winter, the Forest Service announced that it will leave the gates open to facilitate travel to the summit.  The road will not be maintained, so a lifted 4x4 or four-wheel chains are required for motor access during the winter months.

On June 15, 2019, the Oregon Geographic Names Board unanimously endorsed a proposal to give Native American names to 10 unnamed creeks that flow down Mary's Peak. The Confederated Tribes of the Grand Ronde and Confederated Tribes of Siletz Indians were enlisted to be involved in representing the ancient indigenous groups and selecting the new names. The names proposed for adoption are in the languages of the Kalapuya, Wusi’n and Yaqo’n people who originally inhabited the land. Approval from the national board may take up to a year.

References

External links 
 
 

Mountains of the Oregon Coast Range
Landmarks in Oregon
Landforms of Benton County, Oregon
Siuslaw National Forest